The Byzantine–Venetian treaty of 1390 was an agreement between the Byzantine Empire and the Republic of Venice that renewed the truce between the two powers and the Venetian commercial privileges in the Byzantine Empire. 

It was signed during the brief reign of John VII Palaiologos, after fourteen years of fruitless negotiations for the renewal of the previous treaty. It also reiterated the debts owed by the Byzantine emperors to Venice: 17,163  owed as reparations for damages to Venetian merchants, to be paid in five annual installments; 30,000 gold ducats with interest for the crown jewels pawned during the Byzantine civil war of 1341–1347; and 5,000 ducats lent to John V Palaiologos in 1352. The treaty provided the basis for all subsequent Venetian–Byzantine treaties, being renewed almost verbatim in 1406, 1412, 1418, 1423, 1431, 1436, 1442, and finally in 1447.

References

Citations

Sources 

 
 
 

1390 in Europe
1390s treaties
1390s in the Byzantine Empire
14th century in the Republic of Venice
Venice 1390
Byzantium 1390
Treaty 1390
Commercial treaties
Peace treaties
Non-aggression pacts
Medieval Aegean Sea